Stevens Township may refer to:

Stevens Township, Stevens County, Minnesota
Stevens Township, Ramsey County, North Dakota
Stevens Township, Bradford County, Pennsylvania

See also

Stevens (disambiguation)

Township name disambiguation pages